Scalptia textilis is a species of sea snail, a marine gastropod mollusk in the family Cancellariidae, the nutmeg snails.

Description

Distribution
This marine species occurs off the Moluccas, Indonesia.

References

 Hemmen, J. (2007). Recent Cancellariidae. Annotated and illustrated catalogue of Recent Cancellariidae. Privately published, Wiesbaden. 428 pp. 
 Verhecken A. (2008). Cancellariidae. Pp. 816–825, in G.T. Poppe (ed.), Philippine marine mollusks, volume 2. Hackenheim: CoonchBooks

Cancellariidae
Gastropods described in 1841